The Reklaws are a Canadian country music duo from North Dumfries, Ontario, formed in 2012.  The duo consists of siblings Stuart and Jenna Walker. They have released three albums, Freshman Year, Sophomore Slump, and Good Ol' Days. The duo has achieved three Number One hits with "Feels Like That",  "Can’t Help Myself", and "11 Beers" on the Canada Country chart, in addition to multiple gold and platinum certified singles.

Origins
The Walker siblings grew up in North Dumfries, Ontario, and are two in a family of seven.   Their parents owned and operated the Yee Haw Adventure Farm, where they used to perform for visitors.

They got their band name from their mother, who suggested the Reklaws sounded more interesting than the Walkers, Sibling Rivalry, or Bro-Sis.  Reklaw is Walker spelled backwards.

They were nominated for the CCMA Discovery Artist Award in 2013 and then won the Emerging Artist Showcase at the Boots and Hearts Music Festival in 2013. They met with several Nashville songwriters before being signed by Universal Music Canada.

Career

2017–2019: Feels Like That and Freshman Year
The duo scored their first national country music hit in 2017 with "Hometown Kids".

In 2018, they released the EP Long Live the Night. The EP's title track was released in both a "regular" version and a Canadian Football League-themed rewrite which served as a theme song for CFL on TSN games. Their EP Feels Like That was released in 2018 and received a Juno Award nomination for Country Album of the Year. Later in the year they won the Rising Star Award at the Canadian Country Music Association Awards, and performed the kickoff show at the 2018 Grey Cup. The track "Feels Like That" became the duo's first Number One Canada Country hit in January 2019.

In August 2019, the Reklaws released their debut full-length album, Freshman Year on Universal Music Canada. The album included the previously released singles "Hometown Kids", "Long Live the Night", and "Feels Like That", in addition to the top ten hits "I Do Too" and "Old Country Soul".

Their song "Roots" was selected as the official song for TSN's broadcast of the IIHF World Junior Hockey Championship in 2019 and 2020.

2020–present: Sophomore Slump, and Good Ol' Days
In February 2020, the Reklaws joined Dean Brody on the single "Can’t Help Myself". The song would top the Canada Country chart and set the record for most played song ever at Canadian country radio in a single week on the Nielsen BDS charts with 1782 spins. In October 2020, the Reklaws released their second album, Sophomore Slump, featuring their singles, "Where I'm From" and "Not Gonna Not". 

In May 2021, they independently released the promotional single "What the Truck" with fellow Canadian country artist Sacha. The song debuted with over 450,000 streams in its first week, setting the record for the most streamed Canadian country song in a single week. It then became the fastest Canadian country song to reach 1 Million domestic streams. Alongside Brett Kissel, they featured on the single "Somewhere to Drink" by their new labelmate Nate Haller in September of 2021. In March 2022, they released the single "11 Beers" with American country artist Jake Owen. They released their third studio album Good Ol' Days on Starseed Records on November 4, 2022.

In 2023, they participated in an all-star recording of Serena Ryder's single "What I Wouldn't Do", which was released as a charity single to benefit Kids Help Phone's Feel Out Loud campaign for youth mental health.

Tours
Winter's a Beach 
Friends Don’t Let Friends Tour Alone Tour (with Dallas Smith and Dean Brody)

Discography

Albums

Extended plays

Singles

As lead artist

As featured artist

Promotional singles

Notes

Music videos

Awards and nominations

References

External links

Canadian country music groups
Musical groups established in 2012
Musical groups from the Regional Municipality of Waterloo
Sibling musical duos
Universal Music Group artists
2012 establishments in Canada
Canadian Country Music Association Rising Star Award winners
Canadian Country Music Association Album of the Year winners
Canadian Country Music Association Group or Duo of the Year winners